John Jeter (born October 24, 1944) is an American former professional baseball player, an outfielder who played 336 games of Major League Baseball for four teams — the Pittsburgh Pirates, San Diego Padres, Chicago White Sox and Cleveland Indians — between  and . Jeter is an alumnus of Grambling State University.

During his Major League career, Jeter collected 213 hits, including 27 doubles, ten triples and 18 home runs.

He is the father of former Major League outfielder Shawn Jeter.

External links

1944 births
Living people
African-American baseball players
Alijadores de Tampico players
American expatriate baseball players in Mexico
Baseball players from Shreveport, Louisiana
Batavia Pirates players
Cardenales de Lara players
American expatriate baseball players in Venezuela
Charleston Charlies players
Chicago White Sox players
Cleveland Indians players
Columbus Jets players
Florida Instructional League Pirates players
Gastonia Pirates players
Grambling State Tigers baseball players
Iowa Oaks players
Macon Peaches players
Major League Baseball outfielders
Oklahoma City 89ers players
Pittsburgh Pirates players
Raleigh Pirates players
Salem Rebels players
San Diego Padres players
Santo Domingo Azucareros players
Tiburones de La Guaira players
21st-century African-American people
20th-century African-American sportspeople